Yellareddipet is a village in Yellareddipet mandal of Rajanna Siricilla district in the state of Telangana in India.

References

Villages in Rajanna Sircilla district